Trimethyl phosphate is the trimethyl ester of phosphoric acid.  It is a colourless, nonvolatile liquid. It has some specialized uses in the production of other compounds.

Production
Trimethyl phosphate is prepared by treating phosphorus oxychloride with methanol in the presence of an amine base:
POCl3  +  3  CH3OH  +  3 R3N   →     PO(OCH3)3  +  3 R3NH+Cl−
It is a tetrahedral molecule that is a weakly polar solvent.

Applications
Trimethyl phosphate is a mild methylating agent, useful for dimethylation of anilines and related heterocyclic compounds.  The method is complementary to the traditional Eschweiler-Clarke reaction in cases where formaldehyde engages in side reactions.

Trimethyl phosphate is used as a solvent for aromatic halogenations and nitrations as required for the preparation of pesticides and pharmaceuticals.

Other applications 
It is used as a color inhibitor for fibers (e.g. polyester) and other polymers. Trimethyl phosphate is used as a simulant for chemical weapon nerve agents.

Safety considerations
With an LD50 of 2g/kg for rats, trimethylphosphate is expected to have low acute toxicity.

References

External links
WebBook page for C3H9PO4

Organophosphates
Solvents
Methyl esters
Methylating agents
Phosphate esters